Risley Township is a township in Marion County, Kansas, United States.  As of the 2010 census, the township population was 207, not including the city of Hillsboro.

Geography

Cities and towns
The township contains the following settlements:
 City of Hillsboro (north of D Street). The south part is located in Liberty Township.

Cemeteries
The township contains the following cemeteries:
 French Creek Cemetery, located in Section 16 T19S R2E.  
 Johannesthal Cemetery, located in Section 8 T19S R2E.
 Zion Lutheran Church Cemetery, located in Section 34 T19S R2E.

Transportation
U.S. Route 56 and K-15 pass through the township.

References

Further reading

External links
 Marion County website
 City-Data.com
 Marion County maps: Current, Historic, KDOT

Townships in Marion County, Kansas
Townships in Kansas